Baylis Court School is a girls' secondary school with academy status in Slough, Berkshire, England, for students aged 11–18. It is the only single-sex non-selective school in Slough, and has a sixth form which is part of the Herschel Consortium.

History and operations
The school was built in 1971 and converted into an academy in 2011.

After its 2004 inspection of Baylis Court School, the Office for Standards in Education, Children's Services and Skills reported:
[the school is] a good and effective school; it provides a good quality of education for its pupils.

After a Section 5 inspection on 15 October 2007, the school was rated as 'Outstanding' and, indeed, received this rating in all but two of the 26 criteria that are measured against this standard (i.e. the 1-4 Ofsted criteria).

Ofsted's 2004 report also states:  The school population is made up of a very rich cultural mix and comprises:
 Asian or Asian British – Pakistani (57.7 %)
 White – British (13.7 %)
 Asian or Asian British – Indian (12 %)
 Black or Black British – Caribbean (3.7 %)
 Mixed – White and Asian (2.3 %)
 Asian or Asian British – other (2 %)
 Black or Black British – African (1.6 %)
 Mixed – any other (1.5 %)
 Mixed – White and Black Caribbean'' (1.5%)

The school was awarded specialist Arts College status in February 2007. After the school was awarded this they became advanced in the art of learning and many girls have come to succeed after going to Baylis court school.

Baylis Court School is a  school for girls aged 11–19, combining academic excellence with fun and achievement in an impressively wide range of extra-curricular activities. The excellent relationships which staff and girls enjoy ensure the school is a happy and inspiring place in which to grow and learn.

"Our aim for the girls by the time they leave school is that they will be happy, confident and comfortable with themselves; able to enjoy a balance and active lifestyle; manage responsibility and have developed an open-minded, creative approach to life and learning."

References

External links
 , the school's official website

Academies in Slough
Girls' schools in Berkshire
Secondary schools in Slough
1971 establishments in England
Educational institutions established in 1971